The Love Experts is an American television show that was part talk show and part game show that ran from September 18, 1978, to September 7, 1979. It was hosted by Bill Cullen and Jack Clark was the announcer. The show was created by Bob Stewart. Bebu Silvetti's "Spring Rain" was used as the show's theme song.

Premise
Three guests would appear and talk about their love lives. After each guest had told his or her story, a panel of four celebrities would give advice to the contestant.

Decision
After the guests had told their stories, the celebrity panel would choose which of the three contestants had given the most interesting story and that particular contestant won a prize (usually a trip).

Celebrity guests
Among the celebrities who appeared as panelists were David Letterman, Elaine Joyce, Jo Anne Worley, Anita Gillette, Geoff Edwards, Soupy Sales, Nipsey Russell, Jamie Lee Curtis, Jay Johnson and Billy Crystal.

Music
The theme song Spring Rain by Bebu Silvetti was also used as a theme song on two other Bob Stewart produced game show pilots which were Mind Readers (not to be confused with the Goodson-Todman produced game show pilot from 1975 hosted by Jack Clark nor the short-lived, 1979–80 game show hosted by Dick Martin of the same names) hosted by Geoff Edwards in 1978 and the revival of Jackpot hosted by Nipsey Russell in 1984.

Broadcast history
The Love Experts began on September 18, 1978, as a unique syndicated attempt – a talk show with a small game element added in. The series was somewhat of a precursor to the long-running Love Connection, though focused on one person at a time.

References

First-run syndicated television programs in the United States
1970s American game shows
1978 American television series debuts
1979 American television series endings
Television series by Bob Stewart Productions
Television series by Sony Pictures Television
Television series by CBS Studios